James Proche II (born September 21, 1996) is an American football wide receiver and return specialist for the Baltimore Ravens of the National Football League (NFL). He played college football at SMU and was drafted by the Ravens in the sixth round of the 2020 NFL Draft.

Early life and high school
Proche grew up in Dallas, Texas and originally attended Red Oak before transferring to DeSoto High School for his senior year due to academic concerns with Prime Prep. He caught 18 passes for 335 yards and a touchdown in his only season with the Eagles, playing in only seven games due to suffering kidney failure during summer training camp. Rated a three-star recruit, Proche committed to play college football at SMU over offers from Colorado State, Louisville, Maryland, TCU and Wake Forest among other offers.

College career

Proche redshirted his true freshman season. The following season, Proche finished second on the team with 57 receptions, 709 yards and six touchdown catches. As a redshirt sophomore Proche caught 40 passes for 816 yards and six touchdowns and his average of 20.4 yards per catch was 13th-best in the nation. He was named first-team All-American Athletic Conference (AAC) in his redshirt junior year after leading the team with 93 receptions for 1,199 yards and 12 touchdowns. In his final season, Proche caught 112 passes (leading the nation in receptions) for 1,225 yard and 15 touchdowns and was again named first-team All-AAC and a second-team All-American by the Football Writers Association of America.

Professional career

Baltimore Ravens
At the 2020 NFL Combine, Proche ranked fourth overall in the bench press with 20 repetitions and 14th in the 20-yard shuttle with a time of 4.40 seconds. Proche was selected in the sixth round with the 201st overall pick in the 2020 NFL Draft by the Baltimore Ravens.

Proche made his NFL debut on September 13, 2020 in the season opener against the Cleveland Browns, returning two punts for 26 yards. In Week 11, Proche caught his first pass of the season for a 14 yard gain during a 24–30 overtime loss to the Tennessee Titans. He was placed on the reserve/COVID-19 list by the team on December 16, 2020, and activated three days later.

In 2021, Proche had 16 receptions for 202 yards.

References

External links
Baltimore Ravens bio
SMU Mustangs bio

1996 births
Living people
Players of American football from Dallas
American football wide receivers
SMU Mustangs football players
Baltimore Ravens players